The following is a list of lists of MPs for constituencies in Scotland.

By parliament 

 List of MPs for constituencies in Scotland (1959–1964)
 List of MPs for constituencies in Scotland (1964–1966)
 List of MPs for constituencies in Scotland (1966–1970)
 List of MPs for constituencies in Scotland (1970–February 1974)
List of MPs for constituencies in Scotland (February 1974–October 1974)
List of MPs for constituencies in Scotland (October 1974–1979)
List of MPs for constituencies in Scotland (1979–1983)
List of MPs for constituencies in Scotland (1983–1987)
List of MPs for constituencies in Scotland (1987–1992)
 List of MPs for constituencies in Scotland (1992–1997)
 List of MPs for constituencies in Scotland (1997–2001)
 List of MPs for constituencies in Scotland (2001–2005)
 List of MPs for constituencies in Scotland (2005–2010)
 List of MPs for constituencies in Scotland (2010–2015)
 List of MPs for constituencies in Scotland (2015–2017)
 List of MPs for constituencies in Scotland (2017–2019)
 List of MPs for constituencies in Scotland (2019–present)

See also 

 List of parliaments of the United Kingdom
 Scottish representatives to the first Parliament of Great Britain

Lists of politicians lists
Lists of MPs for constituencies in Scotland
Lists of Scottish parliamentarians